World Series of Fighting 34: Gaethje vs. Firmino was a mixed martial arts event promoted by the World Series of Fighting that was held on December 31, 2016 at The Theater at Madison Square Garden in New York City, New York. The event was set to air live in prime time on NBC.

Background
The event was originally scheduled to be headlined by a Welterweight Championship bout between Champion Jon Fitch and former Strikeforce Middleweight Champion Jake Shields on November 12. On October 17, 2016, the World Series of Fighting announced that they cancelled their original plan of holding two separate events on November 12 and December 3. The main event was then scheduled to be headlined by WSOF Lightweight Champion Justin Gaethje and top contender João Zeferino while the co-main event will be the WSOF Welterweight Championship bout between Champion Jon Fitch and Jake Shields.

On October 24, 2016, it was announced that WSOF Bantamweight Champion Marlon Moraes would be defending his championship against WSOF newcomer Josenaldo Silva as the third and final fight on the main card while WSOF Middleweight Champion David Branch defends his championship against top contender Louis Taylor closing out as the final prelim bout of the night.

On December 13, 2016, it was announced that Zeferino was pulled from the title fight against Gaethje after suffering an injury, he was later replaced by Luis Firmino.

Results

See also
List of WSOF events
List of WSOF champions

References

Events in New York City
World Series of Fighting events
2016 in mixed martial arts